First City University College is a private higher education institution, established by the First Nationwide Group, the owner and developer of the 1000 acres integrated township and commercial district of Bandar Utama in Petaling Jaya, Selangor. 

First City University College aims to provide higher education opportunities to Malaysians and international students in a wide range of academic and professional fields such as Business, Computing/IT, Design & Built Environment, Engineering, Hospitality & Tourism and Mass Communication.

Quality education is the hallmark of First City University College with the intended outcome of producing highly employable and future-proof graduates in a knowledge-based economy.

History 
First City University College was established in 1990 as Kolej Swasta Bandar Utama (KSBU) before it was renamed as Kolej Bandar Utama (KBU) in 1993. 

In 2002, KBU was renamed for the second time as KBU International College.
In 2014, KBU International College received approval from the Ministry of Higher Education to be elevated to University College.
On 2 December 2015, KBU International College was officially proclaimed as First City University College  in a ceremony held on its campus grounds in Bandar Utama, Petaling Jaya.

Location 
First City University College is located in the International Education Hub of Bandar Utama. The University College is also adjacent to the bustling Bandar Utama City Centre (BUCC), the location of choice for many commercial and business entities as well as multinationals. 

The many commercial buildings and office towers nearby First City University College include the multi-dimensional First Avenue, 1 Tech Park, Menara IBM and KPMG Tower which are all tagged with the coveted MSC status and 1 Powerhouse, the 28-storey centre for business and commerce.

Bandar Utama/BUCC is also home to the Group-owned, 1Utama Shopping Centre, Centrepoint Bandar Utama and two hotels viz. One World Hotel and AVANTE Hotel.

Campus & Facilities 
First City University College’s full-fledged, eco-friendly campus sits on a prime 13-acre site in the International Education Hub of Bandar Utama.

The campus offers on-campus student accommodation with 24-hour security and smart card access. Various indoor and outdoor sports and recreational facilities e.g. football field, volleyball courts, futsal, table-tennis, badminton courts and basketball court are also made available for students, making the campus an ideal place for an education that is holistic and fulfilling.

First City UC boasts to provide students with many state-of-the-art teaching and learning facilities for them to excel in their study:

    
Future Tech Laboratories: 
 Robotics and Artificial Intelligence (AI)
 Internet of Things (IoT) & Sensor

Engineering Laboratories: 
 Analogue Laboratory
 Communication & Signal Processing Laboratory
 Digital Electronics Laboratory 
 Electronic Computer Aided Design Laboratory  
 Electronic Prototyping Laboratory   
 Engineering Workshop 
 Fluid Mechanics Laboratory  
 IoT & Embedded Systems Laboratory 
 Materials & Advance Manufacturing Process Laboratory 
 Thermodynamics Laboratory

Dedicated IT & Computing Laboratories: 
 CAD Laboratory 
 MAC Laboratory
 Mobile App Development Laboratory 
 Software Development Laboratory
 Electronic Computer Aided Design Laboratory

Design Studios & Workshops: 
 Design Studio
 Drawing Studio
 Fashion Studio
 Macintosh Laboratory with Industry-Relevant Software
 Material Laboratory
 Photography Studio
 Precision Prototyping 3D Printer
 Precision Cutting & Engraving Laser Cutter
 Print Workshop
 Vacuum Forming Machine
 Wood & Metal Workshop

Other facilities include Creative Stove which serves as a commercial outlet to nurture entrepreneurship among students and a project exhibition gallery known as White Canvas.

Hospitality & Tourism Management Facilities:
 Café De One - Training Restaurant
 Garde Manger (Cold Kitchen)
 Hotel De One Front Office
 Mock Hotel Room
 Pastry Kitchen
 Bar Counter
 Training Kitchen with Individual Stations

Mass Communication Facilities:
 Broadcasting Studio
 Photography Studio
 Recording Studio
 Audio Editing Laboratory
 Video Editing Laboratory

Academic Programmes 
First City University College offers academic programmes in the fields of Business, Computing/IT, Design & Built Environment, Engineering, Hospitality & Tourism and Mass Communication which are all reputed to be industry-driven. 
The academic programmes are offered at Foundation, Diploma, Degree and Masters levels. All the programmes are fully accredited by the Malaysian Qualifications Agency.
The University College is structured into the following faculties and centres:
 Faculty of Design & Built Environment
 Faculty of Engineering & Computing
 Faculty of Business, Hospitality & Communication
 Centre for Language & Extension Service
 Centre for General Studies
 Centre for Postgraduate Studies
 Centre for Excellence in Research & Innovation (CERI)

Governance 
First City University College is managed by the Senior Management Group, led by the Vice-Chancellor / CEO Prof Dr Saw Sor Heoh, who works in tandem with the Deans of the Faculties and the Heads of Departments of the institution.
The Board of Governors of First City University College comprises the following esteemed members:
 YBhg Tan Sri Dato’ Ir. (Dr) Teo Chiang Kok (Chairman)
 YBhg Tan Sri Dato’ (Dr) Teo Chiang Liang
 YBhg Tan Sri Dato’ Teo Chiang Hong
 Academician Prof Emeritus Dr Yong Hoi Sen
 YM Dr Raja Lope Bin Raja Shahrome

Academic governance is fulfilled by the Senate, chaired by the Vice-Chancellor and the Senate membership comprises the Registrar, Librarian and all Faculty Deans.

External links 

 First City University College website

References 

Universities and colleges in Selangor
Educational institutions established in 1990
1990 establishments in Malaysia
Petaling Jaya